Cumméne, also spelled Cuimín, Cummin, Cumin etc., is an early Irish name (Latinised as Cumianus or Cummianus, Anglicised Cumian or Cummian) and may refer to:

 Cumméne Fota (d. 661/2), Irish abbot, bishop and theologian, author of a paschal letter
 Cumméne Find (d. 669), also called Albus, hagiographer and abbot of Iona, attended the Synod of Whitby
 Cumianus (d. c. 736), abbot of Bobbio
 Cuimín of Kilcummin, locally venerated saint